This is a list of the heritage sites in Port Elizabeth as recognized by the South African Heritage Resources Agency.

|}

Port Elizabeth
 
Eastern Cape-related lists
Tourist attractions in the Eastern Cape